Barntrean was TV3's children's programming block between 1989 and 2005. The programmes were presented by Ingamay Hörnberg and Skurt and aired on late afternoons-early evening between Monday-Friday and Saturday and Sunday mornings. After over 17 years, Ingamay Hörnberg and Skurt left TV3, which no longer airs children's programming.

Programmes included
 Biker Mice from Mars
 Count Duckula
 Duck Tales
 Dastardly and Muttley in Their Flying Machines
 Flintstones
 Fantastic Max 
 James Bond Junior
 Mighty Morphin' Power Rangers
 The Mysterious Cities of Gold
 Scooby-Doo
 Super Friends
 The Smurfs
 Teenage Mutant Ninja Turtles 
 The Real Ghostbusters
 Tugs
 Widget 
 Yogi Bear
 Digimon

References 

Swedish television shows featuring puppetry
TV3 (Sweden) original programming